The Canadian Society of Forensic Science Journal is a quarterly peer-reviewed academic journal which publishes original research papers, comments, and reviews relating to all aspects of forensic science. It was established in 1968, and is published by Taylor & Francis on behalf of the Canadian Society of Forensic Science. Articles may be published in either English or French.

Editorial board 

The editor-in-chief is Brian Yamashita (Forensic Science and Identification Services, Royal Canadian Mounted Police).

Associate Editors: 
 Rolanda Lam, Royal Canadian Mounted Police
 Cyril Muehlethaler, Université du Québec à Trois-Rivières
 Theresa Stotesbury, Ontario Tech University
 Karen Woodall, University of Toronto
 
Editorial Board members:  
 G. S. Anderson - Simon Fraser University
 C. Boisvert - Laboratoire de sciences judiciaires et de médicine légale (FR)
 F. Chafe - MacEwan University
 G. J. Davis  - University of Kentucky College of Medicine, United States
 S. Forbes  - Université du Québec à Trois-Rivières
 C. Hageman - Ontario Tech University
 N. Hearns - Royal Canadian Mounted Police
 R. Langille - Centre of Forensic Sciences (retired) 
 J. Marshall  - Trent University
 P. Mayne Correia - University of Alberta
 R. Schimpf - Royal Canadian Mounted Police
 T. Tanaka - Canada Border Services Agency
 J. G. Wigmore - Private practice

Abstracting and indexing 
The journal is abstracted and indexed in Excerpta Medica and Chemical Abstracts Service.

According to the Taylor & Francis, the journal had a 2021 Source Normalized Impact per Paper (SNIP) factor of 0.549.

References

External links 
 

Multilingual journals
Quarterly journals
Publications established in 1968
Taylor & Francis academic journals
Criminology journals
Forensic science journals